Layshia Renee Clarendon (born May 2, 1991) is an American professional basketball player for the Los Angeles Sparks of the Women's National Basketball Association (WNBA). Clarendon is the first openly non-binary WNBA player, and the first active WNBA player to complete a top surgery.

Career 
Clarendon completed their college career at the University of California, Berkeley in 2013. The 2012–2013 season saw them become a leader of the team and received national recognition for their abilities, culminating in their place as a finalist for the Senior Class Award.

According to Clarendon's coach Lindsay Gottlieb, "[Clarendon was] vocal in terms of helping us achieve those goals and being a leader off the court and talking to their teammates, but you're never necessarily going to notice that on the court."

For the 2012–2013 regular season, the Clarendon-led Bears lived up to expectations, compiling a 28–2 record (excluding the Pac-12 Tournament) and earning a 2nd seed in the NCAA tournament. Clarendon and the Bears also enjoyed post season success, resulting in the team's first Final Four appearance. The Bears lost in the national semifinals to Louisville.

USA National Team
Clarendon was named to the USA Women's U19 team which represented the US in the 2009 U19 World's Championship, held in Bangkok, Thailand in July and August 2009. Clarendon scored 4.5 points per game, and helped the USA team to an 8–1 record and the gold medal.

WNBA

Indiana Fever (2013–2015)
Clarendon was selected 9th overall in the 2013 WNBA draft by the Indiana Fever. During Clarendon's rookie year, they played in 30 games and averaged just under 20 minutes per game. Clarendon played 3 years for the Fever helping make the playoffs in every year that they were part of the team. They reached the WNBA Finals in their last season with the Fever, falling just short of a title.

Atlanta Dream (2016–2018)
On May 2, the Fever traded Clarendon to the Atlanta Dream in exchange for a 2nd Round Pick in the 2017 WNBA Draft.

Clarendon immediately became the Dream's starting point guard in their first season – starting 32 out of 34 games. In their first start for the Dream, Clarendon set a new career-high with 19 points and grabbed six boards in 31 minutes of action against their former team – the Indiana Fever. They also had a career-high with 19 points, grabbed six rebounds and dished out four assists in the Dream's win over the Connecticut Sun.

On February 1, Clarendon signed a multi-year deal with the Dream - bringing them back to Atlanta for the 2017 season. Clarendon again had a fantastic season making their 1st All-Star game. At the All-Star game, Clarendon recorded 14 points and 10 assists. Clarendon also registered a "unofficial" triple double during the year when they recorded 15 points, 11 assists and 10 rebounds in Atlanta's overtime win over Phoenix. The league reviewed the stats and ultimately took away 2 assists and Clarendon's triple double was taken away.

During the 2018 season, Clarendon played 18 games with the Dream before being traded to the Connecticut Sun.

Connecticut Sun (2018–2019)
Clarendon joined the Sun midway through the season and played in 15 games for the Sun. They averaged 5.4 points per game and 2.7 assists. They scored a season-high 14 points in the Sun's victory over the Lynx on August 17.

Clarendon was hoping to be a key reserve for the Sun going into the 2019 season but their season got derailed after sustaining an ankle injury that required surgery. After surgery, Clarendon was expected to be out for three-to-four months. The Sun had a very successful season making it all the way to the WNBA Finals and Clarendon was hoping to make it back in time to play, but ultimately wasn't ready and healthy to play.

New York Liberty (2020–2021)
Clarendon signed with the New York Liberty on February 10. Coach Walt Hopkins stated that Clarendon "is an elite facilitator and floor general with an extremely high basketball IQ... 'not only leads vocally, but also by consistently modeling a tireless work ethic and respect for those around her. She is going to be a massive boon to our roster and our team culture – both on, and off of the court.'" Clarendon was expected to be a mentor to incoming #1 Draft Pick Sabrina Ionescu. When Ionescu went down with an ankle injury, Clarendon became a bigger part of the team. Clarendon stepped into a starting role with the Liberty and averaged career-highs in field goal percentage with 46.5% and points with 11.5. They also averaged 2.5 rebounds and 3.9 assists per contest.

Clarendon made the 2021 Liberty roster, but only played 3 minutes in the Opening Night game vs the Indiana Fever. After failing to appear in the next two games for the Liberty, Clarendon was waived from the roster.

Minnesota Lynx (2021)
Clarendon signed a hardship contract with the Lynx on May 31 due to the Lynx falling under the roster number due to multiple injuries. Clarendon played that night for the Lynx and sparked a run to help the Lynx get their first win of the season. Clarendon finished with 12 points that game. Due to how hardship contracts work, Clarendon had to be released multiple times once the injured players became healthy. Unfortunately for the Lynx, they continued to have injuries to many players, which worked out well for Clarendon, as they continued to be signed to the Lynx. On July 2, 2021, Clarendon was able to sign with the Lynx on a Rest of the Season deal. Clarendon had a strong season for the Lynx, but struggled as the year ended with a right fibula injury. She finished the season averaging 10.4 points, 5.7 assists, and 3.1 rebounds.

During the 2022 offseason, Clarendon signed to return to Minnesota. On May 3, 2022, after going through all of training camp with the Lynx, Clarendon was waived and did not make the final roster.

WNBA career statistics

Regular season

|-
| style="text-align:left" | 2013
| style="text-align:left" | Indiana
| 30 || 4 || 19.4 || .331|| .259 || .409 || 1.8 || 1.8 || 0.5 || 0.0 || 1.3 || 4.2
|-
| style="text-align:left" | 2014
| style="text-align:left" | Indiana
| 29 || 3 || 13.7 || .402 || .316 || .708 || 1.4 || 1.2 || 0.4 || 0.0 || 1.0 || 4.2
|-
| style="text-align:left" | 2015
| style="text-align:left" | Indiana
| 29 || 12 || 20.8 || .445 || .406 || .765 || 2.7 || 2.0 || 0.7 || 0.0 || 1.6 || 6.7
|-
| style="text-align:left" | 2016
| style="text-align:left" | Atlanta
| 34 || 32 || 28.2 || .466 || .346 || .765 || 4.3 || 3.5 || 0.7 || 0.1 || 2.2 || 10.4
|-
| style="text-align:left" | 2017
| style="text-align:left" | Atlanta
| 34 || 33 || 29.8 || .378 || .180 || .879 || 3.8 || 6.6 || 0.9 || 0.1 || 2.6 || 10.7
|-
| style="text-align:left" | 2018
| style="text-align:left" | Atlanta
| 18 || 4 || 17.3 || .329 || .143 || .800 || 2.1 || 1.7 || 0.4 || 0.0 || 1.3 || 4.3
|-
| style="text-align:left" | 2018
| style="text-align:left" | Connecticut
| 15 || 0 || 15.9 || .492 || .000 || .826 || 1.6 || 2.7 || 0.5 || 0.0 || 0.9 || 5.4
|-
| style="text-align:left" | 2019
| style="text-align:left" | Connecticut
| 9 || 0 || 15.3 || .419 || 1.000 || .857 || 2.4 || 2.1 || 0.3 || 0.0 || 0.9 || 6.2
|-
| style="text-align:left" | 2020
| style="text-align:left" | New York
| 19 || 19 || 26.1 || .465 || .341 || .873 || 2.5 || 3.9 || 0.9 || 0.0 || 3.4 || 11.5
|-
| style="text-align:left" | 2021
| style="text-align:left" | New York
| 1 || 0 || 3.0 || .000 || .000 || .000 || 0.0 || 0.0 || 0.0 || 0.0 || 2.0 || 0.0
|-
| style="text-align:left" | 2021
| style="text-align:left" | Minnesota
| 21 || 20 || 25.7 || .517 || .357 || .784 || 3.1 || 5.7 || 0.6 || 0.0 || 3.0 || 10.4
|-
| align="left" | Career
| align="left" |9 years, 5 teams
| 239 || 127 || 22.1 || .424 || .292 || .793 || 2.7 || 3.2 || 0.6 || 0.0 || 1.9 || 7.6

Postseason

|-
| style="text-align:left" | 2013
| style="text-align:left" | Indiana
| 4 || 0 || 15.3 || .476 || .600 || .250 || 0.5 || 2.0 || 0.5 || 0.0 || 1.5 || 6.0
|-
| style="text-align:left" | 2014
| style="text-align:left" | Indiana
| 5 || 0 || 7.4 || .231 || .000 || .000 || 1.2 || 0.6 || 0.2 || 0.0 || 0.8 || 1.2
|-
| style="text-align:left" | 2015
| style="text-align:left" | Indiana
| 9 || 0 || 6.1 || .500 || .000 || 1.000 || 0.7 || 0.6 || 0.1 || 0.0 || 0.3 || 1.3
|-
| style="text-align:left" | 2016
| style="text-align:left" | Atlanta
| 2 || 2 || 32.0 || .533 || .250 || .625 || 6.0 || 6.0 || 0.0 || 1.0 || 2.0 || 11.0
|-
| style="text-align:left" | 2018
| style="text-align:left" | Connecticut
| 1 || 0 || 10.0 || .500 || .000 || .000 || 0.0 || 0.0|| 1.0 || 0.0 || 0.0 || 2.0
|-
| style="text-align:left" | 2021
| style="text-align:left" | Minnesota
| 1 || 1 || 12.0 || .000 || .000 || .000 || 1.0 || 0.0 || 1.0 || 0.0 || 1.0 || 0.0
|-
| style="text-align:left" | Career
| style="text-align:left" |6 years, 4 teams
| 22 || 3 || 10.9 || .435 || .333 || .571 || 1.2 || 1.3 || 0.3 || 0.1 || 0.9 || 3.0

Activism 
In 2015, Clarendon won Outsports' "Female Hero of the Year", for using their platform in support of LGBTQ+ people in sports. Clarendon stated that they wish to "open closet doors for women across sports".

In 2017, Clarendon discussed the issues within the WNBA in regards to the inclusion of LGBTQ+ people. Clarendon stated that during their early career playing for the Indiana Fever, the team was attempting to include LGBTQ+ individuals by participating in a "Diversity Night" during Pride month, which Clarendon felt was confusingly named, as a way to avoid the true purpose of Pride month. As Clarendon began playing for other teams, they stated that they saw the league becoming more accepting of the LGBTQ+ community.

In 2020, the WNBA and the Players Association branded the upcoming season "Social Justice Season", to emphasize issues including race, gun violence, LGBTQ+ advocacy. Clarendon was named as one of the players on the league's Social Justice Council, which was tasked with engaging community conversations, advocacy, and education on topics surrounding social justice.

The beginning of the 2020 season saw Clarendon involved in protest around the shooting of Breonna Taylor and the "Say her Name" campaign which had begun in 2014. Black Lives Matter was also a predominant message and was visible on the courts during the season.

The Commissioner of the WNBA, Cathy Engelbert, has shown her support for Clarendon by saying, "We are so proud that Layshia is part of the WNBA and we know that their voice and continued advocacy will not only support and help honor and uplift many other non-binary and trans people." The New York Liberty and the WNBA players' union have also shown their support for the transition. The owner of the New York Liberty team, Joseph Tsai released a statement supporting Clarendon saying that they are "a proud embodiment of our belief that our strength lies in our truth and no one should live constrained by societal boundaries."

Personal life
In 2017, Clarendon married Jessica Dolan. Clarendon and Dolan announced the birth of "#babyC" on December 25, 2020, and have yet to release the name or gender of the baby. Clarendon later stated they were raising "Baby C" with gender expansiveness.

Circa 2020, Clarendon came out as non-binary. Clarendon uses she/her, they/them and he/him pronouns. In 2015, Clarendon identified as "black, gay, female, non-cisgender and Christian".

In 2021, Clarendon underwent chest masculinization surgery to remove breast tissue.

College statistics
Source

References

External links

Cal Bears bio

1991 births
Living people
American women's basketball players
Atlanta Dream players
Basketball players from California
California Golden Bears women's basketball players
Connecticut Sun players
Indiana Fever draft picks
Indiana Fever players
LGBT basketball players
LGBT people from California
American LGBT sportspeople
Lesbian sportswomen
Minnesota Lynx players
New York Liberty players
Non-binary sportspeople
Parade High School All-Americans (girls' basketball)
Shooting guards
Sportspeople from San Bernardino, California
Transgender sportspeople
Transgender non-binary people
United States women's national basketball team players
Women's National Basketball Association All-Stars